Tallinn was the seventh ship of the s of the Soviet Navy. She was launched in November 1976 and commissioned in December 1979 at the 61 Communards Shipyard. She was renamed Vladivostok In 1992. After the fall of the USSR, she was scrapped in India in May 1996.

Development and design 
These ships were fitted as flagships with improved command, control and communications facilities. These are dedicated ASW ships with significant anti-aircraft capability including both SA-N-3 and SA-N-4 surface-to-air missiles.

The specifications for the class were issued in 1964 with the design being finalised in the late 1960s. The gas turbine engine was chosen instead of steam for greater efficiency and quietness, and because the main Soviet gas turbine plant had a long association with the Nikolayev shipyards.

Construction and career 
Construction of the ship began on 22 November 1974 at the 61 Communards shipyard in Nikolaev. The ship was launched on 5 November 1975 and entered service on 31 December 1977. On 17 February 1978, it was included in the Russian Pacific Fleet.

From 13 to 17 December 1981, the ship visited Maputo and returned to the port of Victoria in the Seychelles. Tallinn were in the port until January 1982.

From 16 to 20 February 1984 visit to Massawa, Ethiopia.

On March 1, 1985, the ship was transferred to the 183rd BRPK. From 13 to 17 August 1985 visit to Wonsan (North Korea).

From 12 to 16 March 1986, she made a trip to Djibouti.

In January 1989, the ship was transferred to the 201st BRPK.

In 1990, the ship was put under repair at Dalzavod, which was later actually frozen.

Since March 1991, Tallinn was included in the 48th Anti-submarine Ships Division (DIPK).

In September 1992 it received a new name Vladivostok.

After the collapse of the USSR, on 5 July 1994, she was stricken, in May 1996 and sent to India for scrap.

Further reading 

 Photo gallery

References

Kara-class cruisers
Ships built at Shipyard named after 61 Communards
1976 ships
Cold War cruisers of the Soviet Union